Rafail Ostrovsky is a distinguished professor of computer science and mathematics at UCLA and a well-known researcher in algorithms and cryptography.

Biography
Rafail Ostrovsky received his Ph.D. from MIT in 1992.

He is a member of the editorial board of Algorithmica 
, Editorial Board of Journal of Cryptology  and Editorial and Advisory Board of the International Journal of Information and Computer Security .

Awards
 2021 ACM Fellow for "contributions to the foundations of cryptography"
 2018 RSA Award for Excellence in Mathematics
 2006 IBM Faculty Award
 2006 and 2005 Xerox Innovation Group Award
 2004 OKAWA Research Award; the 1993 Henry Taub Prize
 1999, 2001, and 2002 best published work of the year at SAIC in computer science and mathematics.
 1996 Bellcore prize for excellence in research

Publications
Some of Ostrovsky's contributions to computer science include:
 1990 Introduced  (with R. Venkatesan and M. Yung)  the notion of interactive hashing  proved essential for constructing statistical zero-knowledge proofs for NP based on any one-way function (see NOVY and ).
 1991 Introduced (with M. Yung) the notion of  mobile adversary (later renamed proactive security) (see survey of Goldwasser  or over 400 citations in Google Scholar)
 1992 Proved the existence of asymptotically optimal software protection scheme (later renamed searching on encrypted data) assuming the existence of Tamper-resistant Microprocessor 
 1993 Proved (with A. Wigderson) equivalence of one-way functions and zero-knowledge .
 1996 Introduced (with R. Canetti, C. Dwork and M. Naor) the notion of deniable encryption .
 1997 Invented (with E. Kushilevitz) the first single server private information retrieval protocol  (see over 400 citations in Google Scholar).
 1997 Showed (with E. Kushilevitz and Y. Rabani) (1+ε) poly-time and poly-size approximate-nearest neighbor search for high-dimensional data for  L1-norm and Euclidean space (see over 320 citations in   Google Scholar).

References

External links
 Ostrovsky's home page
 Some of Ostrovsky's publications

1963 births
Living people
American computer scientists
Jewish American scientists
Modern cryptographers
Theoretical computer scientists
Computer security academics
American cryptographers
University of California, Los Angeles faculty
Massachusetts Institute of Technology alumni
21st-century American Jews